We-Sorts (also Wesorts) is a name for a group of Native Americans in Maryland who are from the Piscataway tribe. It is regarded as derogatory and a pejorative by some, and rarely used by the current younger generation. The Piscataway were powerful at the time of European encounter. Many individuals with the surnames Proctor, Newman, Wright, Savoy, Queen, Butler, Thompson, Swann, Gray, and Harley claim that Native heritage. Many are notably of a mixed race between black, white and Native American. "Some members of the Piscataway Indian groups now consider the name Wesort derogatory." Historian Frank Sweet lists "Wesorts" as among a group of "derogatory epithets given by mainstream society, not self-labels". However, "Wesort" is listed as a self-identified "Other race" on the 2000 United States Census.

In the early 1930s, weekend-farmer Alice Ferguson noticed that people were finding small artifacts in her fields and decided to do some digging around, according to newspaper reports. Between 1935 and 1939, she uncovered at least five mass-burial pits containing the 300-year-old remains of about 500 Piscataway people. Over the years, she gave most of the remains, the bones from about 467 individuals, to the Smithsonian Institution. She called the trust to come pick up what was left—the very partial remains of 36 individuals—said Hughes. The trust has determined that the remains are of Piscataway people. Alice and Henry Ferguson wrote and the Alice Ferguson Foundation published The Piscataway Indians of Southern Maryland in 1960. State officials say that most of the about 25,000 Native Americans who live in Maryland are Piscataway.

In literature
Wayne Karlin's novel The Wished For Country (2002) represents the origins and struggles of the Wesorts as a multicultural people in the early days of Maryland's first European settlement at St. Mary's City. The Los Angeles Times reviewed The Wished-For Country as a contribution to the history of "the common people," calling the book "an attempt in novel form to bring to life the original Wesorts and their turbulent world."

See also

Doeg people
Mattawoman
Nanjemoy
Nanticoke people
Pamunkey
Patuxent people
Piscataway people
Yaocomico
Turkey Tayac
List of place names in Maryland of Native American origin
Maroon people
Melungeon
Black Indians in the United States
Brass Ankles
Redbone

References

External links
Article by William Harlen Gilbert, Jr., of the Library of Congress, 1946 - see Section X, Wesorts of Southern Maryland
The Cedarville Band of Piscataway Indians
Piscataway Indian Nation
 Gabrielle Tayac, "The story of Jamestown through the eyes of a Native American", McClatchy Newspapers (May 1, 2007)
Piscataway Indians, Catholic Encyclopedia, 1911
Thomas Ford Brown, "Ethnic Identity Movements and the Legal Process: The Piscataway Revival", Lamar University host

Charles County, Maryland
American genealogy
African–Native American relations
African-American history of Maryland
Ethnic and religious slurs
Native American tribes in Maryland
Piscataway tribe